

J

Jáchymovite (IMA1994-025) 7.EA.10   
Jacobsite (spinel, spinel: IMA1982 s.p., 1869) 4.BB.05    (IUPAC: manganese(II) diiron(III) tetraoxide)
Jacquesdietrichite (IMA2003-012) 6.AB.80   
Jacutingaite (IMA2010-078) 2.0  [no]  (IUPAC: diplatinum mercury triselenide)
Jadarite (IMA2006-036) 9.AJ.40   
Jadeite (pyroxene: IMA1988 s.p., 1863) 9.DA.25    (IUPAC: sodium aluminium hexaoxy disilicate)
Jaffeite (IMA1987-056) 9.BE.12    (IUPAC: hexacalcium heptaoxy disilicate hexahydroxyl)
Jagoite (Y: 1957) 9.EG.50   
Jagowerite (IMA1973-001) 8.BH.55    (IUPAC: barium dialuminium dihydro diphosphate)
Jagüéite (chrisstanleyite: IMA2002-060) 2.BC.15   [no] (IUPAC: dicopper tripalladium tetraselenide)
Jahnsite (whiteite) 8.DH.15
Jahnsite-(CaFeFe)N (1995) 8.DH.15  [no] [no]
Jahnsite-(CaFeMg) (IMA2013-111) 8.DH.15  [no] [no]
Jahnsite-(CaMnFe) (IMA1978 s.p. Rd) 8.DH.15   
Jahnsite-(CaMnMg) (IMA1973-022 Rd) 8.DH.15   
Jahnsite-(CaMnMn) (IMA1987-020a) 8.DH.15   
Jahnsite-(CaMnZn) (IMA2019-073) 8.DH.15  [no] [no]
Jahnsite-(MnMnFe) (IMA2018-096) 8.DH.15  [no] [no]
Jahnsite-(MnMnMn) (IMA1978 s.p. Rd) 8.DH.15   [no]
Jahnsite-(MnMnZn) (IMA2017-113) 8.DH.15  [no] [no]
Jahnsite-(NaFeMg) (IMA2007-016) 8.DH.15   [no]
Jahnsite-(NaMnMg) (IMA2018-017) 8.DH.15   [no]
Jahnsite-(NaMnMn) (IMA2019-051) 8.DH.15  [no] [no]
JaipuriteQ (nickeline: 1845) 2.CC.05   [no] (IUPAC: cobalt sulfide)
Jakobssonite (IMA2011-036) 3.0  [no]  (IUPAC: calcium aluminium pentafluoride)
Jalpaite (Y: 1858) 2.BA.45    (IUPAC: trisilver copper disulfide)
Jamborite (related to hydrotalcite supergroup (Rd): IMA2014-E, IMA1971-037) 4.FL.05   
Jamesite (IMA1978-079) 8.BK.25   
Jamesonite (Y: 1825) 2.HB.15    (IUPAC: tetralead iron tetradecasulfa hexaantimonide)
Janchevite (asisite: IMA2017-079) 4.0  [no] [no]
Janggunite (IMA1975-011) 4.FG.05   
Janhaugite (wöhlerite: IMA1981-018) 9.BE.17   
Jankovićite (IMA1993-050) 2.HD.20   
Jarandolite (IMA1995-020c) 6.CB.25    (IUPAC: calcium trihydro tetraoxo triborate)
Jarlite (jarlite: 1933) 3.CC.20   
Jarosewichite (IMA1981-060) 8.BE.70    (IUPAC: manganese(III) trimanganese(II) hexahydro arsenate)
Jarosite (alunite, alunite: IMA1987 s.p., 1852 Rd) 7.BC.10    (IUPAC: potassium triiron(III) hexahydro disulfate)
Jaskólskiite (meneghinite: IMA1982-057) 2.HB.05c    ( (x ≈ 0.15))
Jasmundite (IMA1981-047) 9.AG.70    (IUPAC: undecacalcium dioxy tetra(tetraoxysilicate) sulfide)
Jasonsmithite (IMA2019-121) 8.0  [no] [no]
Jasrouxite (lillianite: IMA2012-058) 2.0  [no]  (Ag16Pb4(Sb25As15)Σ40S72)
Jaszczakite (buckhornite: IMA2016-077) 2.0  [no] [no] (IUPAC: [tribismuth trisulfide][gold disulfide])
Javorieite (IMA2016-020) 3.0  [no] [no] (IUPAC: potassium iron trichloride)
Jeanbandyite (stottite: IMA1980-043) 4.FC.15   
Jeankempite (IMA2018-090) 8.CJ.  [no] [no] (IUPAC: pentacalcium diarsenate di(hydroxoarsenate) heptahydrate)
Jedwabite (alloy: IMA1995-043) 1.AE.25    (IUPAC: heptairon tritantalum alloy)
Jeffbenite (IMA2014-097) 9.0  [no] [no] (IUPAC: trimagnesium dialuminium dodecaoxy trisilicate)
Jeffreyite (melilite: IMA1982-075) 9.BB.10   
Jennite (IMA1965-021) 9.DG.20    (IUPAC: nonacalcium di(nonaoxy trisilicate) hexahydroxyl octahydrate)
Jensenite (tellurium oxysalt: IMA1994-043) 4.FL.60    (IUPAC: tricopper(II) tellurium(VI) hexaoxide dihydrate)
Jentschite (IMA1993-025) 2.HD.40    (IUPAC: palladium thallium diarsenic hexasulfa antimonide)
Jeppeite (IMA1980-080) 4.CC.50   
Jeremejevite (Y: 1883) 6.AB.15    (IUPAC: hexaaluminium pentaborate fluoride)
Jerrygibbsite (humite: IMA1981-059) 9.AF.70    (IUPAC: nonamanganese(II) tetra(tetraoxysilicate) dihydroxyl)
Jervisite (pyroxene: IMA1980-012) 9.DA.25    (IUPAC: sodium scandium(III) hexaoxy disilicate)
Ježekite (IMA2014-079) 5.0  [no] [no] (IUPAC: octasodium [uranyl tricarbonate] disulfate trihydrate)
Jianshuiite (IMA1990-019) 4.FL.20    (IUPAC: magnesium trimanganese(IV) heptaoxide trihydrate)
Jimboite (IMA1963-002) 6.AA.35    (IUPAC: trimanganese(II) diborate)
Jimthompsonite (IMA1977-011) 9.DF.05    (IUPAC: pentamagnesium hexadecaoxy hexasilicate dihydroxyl)
Jingsuiite (IMA2018-117b) 6.0  [no] [no] (IUPAC: titanium diboride)
Jingwenite-(Y) (IMA2021-070)  [no] [no]
Jinshajiangite (seidozerite, bafertisite: IMA1981-061) 9.BE.67   
Joanneumite (IMA2012-001) 10.0  [no] [no] (IUPAC: bis(isocyanurato)diamminecopper(II))
Joaquinite-(Ce) (joaquinite: IMA2001 s.p., 1932 Rd) 9.CE.25   
Joegoldsteinite (spinel: IMA2015-049) 2.0  [no] [no] (IUPAC: manganese dichromium tetrasulfide)
Joëlbruggerite (dugganite: IMA2008-034) 8.B0.20   [no]
Joesmithite [Ca-amphibole: IMA2012 s.p., 1968] 9.DE.10   
Johachidolite (IMA1977 s.p., 1942 Rd) 6.CC.05    (IUPAC: calcium aluminium heptaoxo triborate)
Johanngeorgenstadtite (alluaudite: IMA2019-122) 8.0  [no] [no]
Johannite (johannite: 1830) 7.EB.05    (IUPAC: copper diuranyl dihydro disulfate octahydrate)
Johannsenite (pyroxene: IMA1988 s.p., 1938) 9.DA.15    (IUPAC: calcium manganese hexaoxy disilicate)
Johillerite (alluaudite: IMA1980-014) 8.AC.10    (IUPAC: sodium copper trimagnesium triarsenate)
Johnbaumite (apatite: IMA1980-B) 8.BN.05    (IUPAC: pentacalcium hydro triarsenate)
Johninnesite (IMA1985-046) 9.DH.70   
Johnkoivulaite (beryl: IMA2019-046) 9.C  [no] [no]
Johnsenite-(Ce) (eudialyte: IMA2004-026) 9.CO.10   
Johnsomervilleite (fillowite: IMA1979-032) 8.AC.50   
Johntomaite (bjarebyite: IMA1999-009) 8.BH.20    (IUPAC: barium diiron(II) diiron(III) trihydro triphosphate)
Johnwalkite (IMA1985-008) 8.DJ.05   
Jôkokuite (chalcanthite: IMA1976-045) 7.CB.20    (IUPAC: manganese(II) sulfate pentahydrate)
Joliotite (IMA1974-014) 5.EB.15    (IUPAC: uranyl carbonate dihydrate)
Jolliffeite (ullmannite: IMA1989-011) 2.EB.25    (IUPAC: nickel arsenide selenide)
Jonassonite (IMA2004-031) 2.LA.65   [no]
Jonesite (IMA1976-040) 9.DJ.30   
Joosteite (wagnerite: IMA2005-013) 8.BB.15   [no] (IUPAC: manganese(II) manganese(III) oxophosphate)
Jordanite (geocronite: 1864) 2.JB.30a   
Jordisite (amorphous: 1909) 2.EA.30    (IUPAC: molybdenum disulfide)
Jørgensenite (jarlite: IMA1995-046) 3.CC.20   
Jörgkellerite (IMA2015-020) 8.0  [no] [no]
Joséite-AQ (tetradymite: 1944) 2.D?.    (IUPAC: tetrabismuth telluride disulfide) Note: possibly the questionable and not approved joséite.
Joséite-BQ (tetradymite: 1949) 2.DC.05    (IUPAC: tetrabismuth ditelluride sulfide) Note: possibly a sulfur-rich variety of pilsenite.
Joteite (IMA2012-091) 8.0  [no] [no] (IUPAC: calcium copper aluminium dihydro arsenate dioxo(hydroarsenate) pentahydrate)
Jouravskite (ettringite: IMA1965-009) 7.DG.15    (IUPAC: tricalcium manganese(IV) hexahydro sulfate carbonate dodecahydrate)
Juabite (tellurite-arsenate: IMA1996-001) 4.JN.30    (IUPAC: calcium decacopper dihydro tetratellurite tetrarsenate tetrahydrate)
Juangodoyite (IMA2004-036) 5.AB.60    (IUPAC: disodium copper dicarbonate)
Juanitaite (IMA1999-022) 8.DE.40   
JuaniteQ (Y: 1932) 9.HA.70   
Juansilvaite (IMA2015-080) 8.0  [no] [no] (IUPAC: pentasodium trialuminium tetraoxohydroarsenate dioxodihydroarsenate disulfate hydrate)
Julgoldite (pumpellyite) 9.BG.20
Julgoldite-(Fe2+) (IMA1966-033) 9.BG.20   
Julgoldite-(Fe3+) (IMA1973 s.p., IMA1972-003) 9.BG.20   [no]
Julgoldite-(Mg) (IMA1973 s.p., IMA1972-003a) 9.BG.20  [no] [no]
Julienite (IMA2007 s.p., 1928) 10.AD.05    (IUPAC: disodium tetrathiocyanatocobaltate(II) octahydrate)
Jungite (IMA1977-034) 8.DJ.25    (IUPAC: dicalcium tetrazinc octairon(III) nonahydro nonaphosphate hexadecahydrate)
Junitoite (IMA1975-042) 9.BD.15    (IUPAC: calcium dizinc heptaoxy disilicate monohydrate)
Junoite (IMA1974-011) 2.JB.25a   
Juonniite (overite: IMA1996-060) 8.DH.20    (IUPAC: calcium magnesium scandium hydro diphosphate tetrahydrate)
Jurbanite (IMA1974-023) 7.DB.15    (IUPAC: aluminium hydro sulfate pentahydrate)
JusiteQ (Y: 1943) 9.D?.  [no] [no] Note: probably tobermorite.

External links
IMA Database of Mineral Properties/ RRUFF Project
Mindat.org - The Mineral Database
Webmineral.com
Mineralatlas.eu minerals H and J